Erbil Observatory is an astronomical observatory in Erbil, The Kurdistan Region. It was established in 1973.

History 
In 1973 President Ahmed Hassan al-Bakr ordered the construction of the Erbil Observatory, an observatory with three telescopes.

In the early 1980s about 400 people were working on behalf of Baresel, Epple, Krupp, Liebherr and Zeiss to build 3 telescopes. In late 1983 they ran tests on the small telescope. Although the building site was close to the war zone, people were safe from the Iran military. 400 people from about 10 countries were working here. Each time the crew flew home for winter holidays, the building-site needed to take safety precautions due to heavy snowfalls. Eventually, the war made it impossible to finish the building. The partly-built Observatories were destroyed by the Iranian rockets launched during the Iran–Iraq War.

In Art 
Hito Steyerl included the Erbil Observatory in one of her short films.

See also
 Abdul Athem Alsabti
 List of astronomical observatories
 Mount Korek
May Kaftan-Kassim

References

External links
 Seeing Stars in Iraq
 Astronomy in Iraq
 Restoring Wrecked Observatory May boost Iraqi Science
 Restoring Wrecked Observatory – Scientific American
 Kurdish Amateur Astronomer’s Association

Astronomical observatories in Iraq
1973 establishments in Iraq